The House of Canossa was an Italian noble family from Lucca holding the castle of Canossa, from the early tenth to the early twelfth century.

Sigifred of Lucca built the castle at Canossa around 940. Adalbert Atto appears in Canossa in time to give refuge to Queen Adelaide when she was fleeing Berengar II and Willa in 955.

Last ruler of the dynasty was Matilda of Tuscany (c. 1046 – 1115). Her court became a refuge for many displaced persons during the turmoil of the investiture dispute and experienced a cultural boom. In 1111 Matilda was reportedly crowned Imperial Vicar and Vice-Queen of Italy by Henry V, Holy Roman Emperor. With her death, the House of Canossa became extinct in 1115.

Genealogy
Sigifredo of Lucca along with his three sons built the Castle of Canossa. He died after 940. His sons were-
Sigifredo who died after 972 and married Baratina of Parma .
 Gerado who died before 10 Jun 998 and married Gibertina of Parma
 Adalbert Atto who died after 13 Feb 975. He was the Count of Reggio and Mantua. He married Ildegarde. Their children were
Rodolfo who died about 973
Tedaldo who died 8 May 1012 Count of Reggio who married Guillia. Their son was Bonifazio 985-1052 Marchese of Tuscany
Goffredo who died after 998 and was Bishop of Brescia
Prangarda wife of Manfredo I Marchese of Turin

http://fmg.ac/Projects/MedLands/NORTHERN%20ITALY%20900-1100.htm#PrangardaMofTurin

House of Canossa